The table below lists the judgments of the Constitutional Court of South Africa delivered in 2018.

The members of the court at the start of 2018 were Chief Justice Mogoeng Mogoeng, Deputy Chief Justice Raymond Zondo, and judges Edwin Cameron, Johan Froneman, Chris Jafta, Sisi Khampepe, Mbuyiseli Madlanga, Nonkosi Mhlantla and Leona Theron. There were two vacancies. Azhar Cachalia, Daniel Dlodlo, Patricia Goliath, Fayeeza Kathree-Setiloane, Jody Kollapen, Xola Petse and Dumisani Zondi sat as acting judges on judgments delivered in this year.

References
 

2018
Constitutional Court